Section 20 may refer to:

 Section 20, fictional branch of the Secret Intelligence Service (MI6) in the Strike Back (TV series) universe
 Section Twenty of the Canadian Charter of Rights and Freedoms
 Section 20 of the Indian Penal Code
Significant sections numbered 20 in legislation:
Section 20A of the (South African) Sexual Offences Act, 1957
Section 20 of the UK's Children Act 1989